Acera is a frazione of the comune of Campello sul Clitunno in the Province of Perugia, Umbria, central Italy. It stands at an elevation of 972 metres above sea level. At the time of the Istat census of 2001 it had 19 inhabitants.

History
Near the town, which gets its name from the surrounding maple woods, at Monte Maggiore (1.430), there were found 
prehistoric and Roman remains. The Castello di Acera (The maple castle) was built in 1296 by a Podestà sent from 
Spoleto to unite the dispersed population of the villages Acera and Spina.
After the Italian unification of 1860 it became part of Campello sul Clitunno.

References 

Frazioni of the Province of Perugia